The Peel Trident is the second three-wheeled microcar built by the Peel Engineering Company on the Isle of Man. An all-new design from its one-seat counterpart the Peel P50, the Trident has two seats.

History
The Trident was launched at the 1964 British Motorcycle Show held at Earls Court.

A completely new design from the earlier side-engined Peel P50 microcar, the Trident was manufactured in 1965 and 1966.

In 2011, Peel Engineering Ltd. reinstated manufacture of the Peel Trident and P50, in Sutton-in-Ashfield, near Nottingham, England. All vehicles are hand-built to order in petrol and electric form.

Description and specifications
The glass-fibre shell was a monocoque with coil-sprung, undamped wheels. It featured a clear bubble top and either two seats or one seat with a detachable shopping basket.

The Lakeland Motor Museum observes that the Trident's bubble top constituted grounds for its sobriquet "The Terrestrial Flying Saucer." Like its predecessor, it was marketed as a "shopping car" or a "Saloon Scooter".

It was advertised that the Trident got , "almost cheaper than walking". The original retail price was £190.

All engines supplied to Peel from Zweirad Union (for both the P50 and Trident) were of the 49 cc 3-speed 4.2 hp 804–1600 type.  Uniquely, however, the Peel engines had the 8th digit as a 4, thus being of the form 80416004***. This car is one of the smallest in the world.

Media appearances
The Trident made a late transatlantic media appearance in the American television series Monster Garage, when a team of engineers and fabricators attempted to fit a high-performance Suzuki Hayabusa superbike engine into the bodywork of a Trident, mounted onto a conventional go-kart frame. The project was a failure, and the unfinished car was destroyed by the show's host Jesse James with a single shot from a .50 caliber sniper rifle.

It also made a brief appearance in the BBC motoring programme Top Gear on BBC Two, when the P50 was featured more extensively and the Trident was introduced as a "sports version". Co-presenter James May described the Peel Trident as "something out of The Jetsons", and co-presenter Jeremy Clarkson described the Trident and the P50 as his perfect two-car garage.

The Trident appeared on the BBC business programme Dragons Den in August 2010. The Trident made another appearance, driven by Rutledge Wood, on the second episode of the third season of Top Gear US.

The vehicle is included in Time magazine's list of the 50 Worst Cars Ever.

The Trident appears in the racing video game Forza Horizon 4 and Forza Horizon 5.

References

External links

 Information, photos and factory movie at MicroCarMuseum.com
 Peel Cars, includes photographs at their hometown in Isle of Man
 Multi-make Microcar Club
 Manufacturer of reproduction Tridents P50CARS.com
 Peel Microcars, Isle of Man.
 Peel Owner's Club Peel Owner's Club - Website for owners of original Peel Tridents and faithful replicas, a source for history, image gallery and spare parts.

Microcars
Three-wheeled motor vehicles
Peel Engineering Company
Peel vehicles
Cars introduced in 1965
Peel, Isle of Man